The dark photon (also hidden, heavy, para-, or secluded photon) is a hypothetical hidden sector particle, proposed as a force carrier similar to the photon of electromagnetism but potentially connected to dark matter. In a minimal scenario, this new force can be introduced by extending the gauge group of the Standard Model of Particle Physics with a new abelian U(1) gauge symmetry. The corresponding new spin-1 gauge boson (i.e., the dark photon) can then couple very weakly to electrically charged particles through kinetic mixing with the ordinary photon and could thus be detected. The dark photon can also interact with the Standard Model if some of the fermions are charged under the new abelian group. The possible charging arrangements are restricted by a number of consistency requirements such as anomaly cancellation and constraints coming from Yukawa matrices.

Motivation 
Observations of gravitational effects that cannot be explained by visible matter alone imply the existence of matter which does not or does only very weakly couple to the known forces of nature. This dark matter dominates the matter density of the universe, but its particles (if there are any) have eluded direct and indirect detection so far. Given the rich interaction structure of the well-known Standard Model particles, which make up only the subdominant component of the universe, it is natural to think about a similarly interactive behaviour of dark sector particles. Dark photons could be part of these interactions among dark matter particles and provide a non-gravitational window (a so-called vector portal) into their existence by kinematically mixing with the Standard Model photon. Further motivation for the search for dark photons comes from several observed anomalies in astrophysics (e.g., in cosmic rays) that could be related to dark matter interacting with a dark photon. Arguably the most interesting application of dark photons arises in the explanation of the discrepancy between the measured and the calculated anomalous magnetic moment of the muon. This discrepancy is usually thought of as a persisting hint for physics beyond the Standard Model and should be accounted for by general new physics models. Beside the effect on electromagnetism via kinetic mixing and possible interactions with dark matter particles, dark photons (if massive) can also play the role of a dark matter candidate themselves. This is theoretically possible through the misalignment mechanism.

Theory 
Adding a sector containing dark photons to the Lagrangian of the Standard Model can be done in a straightforward and minimal way by introducing a new U(1) gauge field. The specifics of the interaction between this new field, potential new particle content (e.g., a Dirac fermion for dark matter) and the Standard Model particles are virtually only limited by the creativity of the theorist and the constraints that have already been put on certain kinds of couplings. The arguably most popular basic model involves a single new broken U(1) gauge symmetry and kinetic mixing between the corresponding dark photon field  and the Standard Model hypercharge fields. This term arises naturally by writing down all terms allowed by the gauge symmetry. After electroweak symmetry breaking and diagonalising the terms containing the field strength tensors (kinetic terms) by redefining the fields, the relevant terms in the Lagrangian are

where is the mass of the dark photon (in this case it can be thought of as being generated by the Higgs or Stueckelberg mechanism),  is the parameter describing the kinetic mixing strength and denotes the electromagnetic current with its coupling . The fundamental parameters of this model are thus the mass of the dark photon and the strength of the kinetic mixing. Other models leave the new U(1) gauge symmetry unbroken, resulting in a massless dark photon carrying a long-range interaction. A massless dark photon, however, will experimentally be hard to distinguish from the Standard Model photon. The incorporation of new Dirac fermions as dark matter particles in this theory is uncomplicated and can be achieved by simply adding the Dirac terms to the Lagrangian.

Experiments

Direct conversion 

A massive dark photon candidate with kinetic mixing strength  could spontaneously convert to a Standard Model photon. A cavity, with resonant frequency tuned to match the mass of a dark photon candidate , can be used to capture the resulting photon.

One technique to detect the presence of signal photon in the cavity is to amplify the cavity field with a quantum limited amplifier. This method is prevalent in the search for axion dark matter. With linear amplification, however, is difficult to overcome the effective noise imposed by the standard quantum limit and search for dark photon candidates that would produce a mean cavity population much less than 1 photon.

By counting the number of photons in the cavity, it is possible to subvert the quantum limit. This technique has been demonstrated by researchers at the University of Chicago in collaboration with Fermilab.
This has enabled a search speed up of over 1,000 as compared to the conventional linear amplification technique.

The Heavy Photon Search (HPS) experiment at Jefferson Lab collides multi-GeV electrons with a tungsten target foil. Assuming that dark photons can also be produced in the collisions and would then decay into positron-electron pairs, the experiment searches for an excess of pairs that would originate from dark photon decay. A 2023 analysis of the QCD data including HPS data reported the signature of a dark photon with mass between 4.2 to 6.2 GeV, with a confidence level of 8 standard deviations.

See also

References 

Bosons
Dark matter
Hypothetical elementary particles
Physics beyond the Standard Model
Dark concepts in astrophysics
Force carriers